Korea JoongAng Daily is the English edition of the South Korean national daily newspaper JoongAng Ilbo. The newspaper was first published on October 17, 2000, originally named as JoongAng Ilbo English Edition. It mainly carries news and feature stories by staff reporters, and some stories translated from the Korean language newspaper. 

Korea JoongAng Daily is one of the three main English newspapers in South Korea along with The Korea Times and The Korea Herald. The newspaper is published with a daily edition of The New York Times and it is located within the main offices of the JoongAng Ilbo in Sangam-dong, Mapo-gu, Seoul.

See also

List of newspapers in South Korea

References

External links
Official website

2000 establishments in South Korea
Centre-right newspapers
Conservative media in South Korea
English-language newspapers published in South Korea
Newspapers published in South Korea